The Battle of the Cremera was fought between the Roman Republic and the Etruscan city of Veii, in 477 BC (276 AUC).

It most likely occurred on 18 July, although Ovid gives a different date of 13 February.

Background

Since the overthrow of the Roman monarchy in 509 BC, the Roman Republic and its neighbour Veii had been at peace.

Conflict erupted, however, in 483 BC with a series of clashes that occurred almost annually.  Rome was victorious in a close-fought battle in 480 BC; nevertheless, hostilities continued.

In 479 BC, the family of the Fabii offered to take the Roman responsibility for the war upon themselves, which the Roman senate accepted.  The Fabii built a camp on the Cremera, from which they harassed Veii and held back its raids on Rome. The Fabii were successful in the fighting in 478 BC and 477 BC prior to the main battle which followed.

Account of the battle

The Veientes, embarrassed by their lack of success, formed plans for an ambush of the Fabii.  The Veientes led a herd of cattle along a road, at a distance from the Fabian camp at the Cremera, in order to lure the Romans from their camp and into an ambush.  The Romans pursued the herd and scattered to capture the animals.  At that point, the Veientes sprang from their hiding places and surrounded the Fabii.  The Veientes were superior in number; however, the Romans formed a wedge formation, broke through and reached a hill, where they successfully repulsed the initial Veientine attacks, until some of the Veientes went around the Romans to attack them from the rear, uphill from the Romans.

All of the Fabii were slaughtered save Quintus Fabius Vibulanus, who was too young to be sent to war.

Aftermath

Upon hearing of the grave defeat, the Roman Senate sent the consul Titus Menenius Lanatus with an army against the Veientes, but the Romans were defeated once again.  The Veientes marched on Rome, and occupied the Janiculum.  There were two indecisive battles against the Veientes, the first near the temple of Spes near the Praenestine Gate, and the second at the Colline Gate.  Thereafter the Veientes withdrew from Rome and set about ravaging the countryside, until they were defeated by the Romans in the following year.

References

Primary sources
, II (print: Book 1 as The Rise of Rome, Oxford University Press, 1998)
 Dionysius of Halicarnassus: Roman antiquities at LacusCurtius, IX.

Cremera
477 BC
Cremera
5th century BC in the Roman Republic
470s BC conflicts
Veii